Quick Mail Queuing Protocol (QMQP) is a network protocol designed to share e-mail queues between several hosts. It was designed and implemented by Daniel J. Bernstein in qmail.

External links
 QMQP Frequently Asked Questions
 Postfix QMQP Implementation

Internet mail protocols